Delta Phi Omega (commonly referred to as DPO, or  ) is a nationally-based, South Asian-interest, multicultural sorority in the United States, with over 2,600 sisters in twenty-five chapters and twenty-six colonies across the nation. It is categorized as a social, service and philanthropy-based Greek letter organization whose main focus is to empower women and promote cultural awareness through involvement with their universities and communities. It has joined organizations such as the National APIDA Panhellenic Association (NAPA) to better convey its efforts to promote the greater good alongside other communities. Delta Phi Omega Sorority, Inc. is the largest South Asian interest-based sorority in the nation.

Origin 
On December 6, 1998,  sixteen South Asian women formed Delta Phi Omega at the University of Houston.The sixteen Honorable National Founding Mothers are:

Simran Bakshi-Guiterrez
Heena Bhakta-Palmer
Leena Cherian-Joseph
Bonna Choudhari
Rita Dhanani-Rauniyar
Anita Jari-Kharbanda
Amitha Nikam-Verma
Avni Patel
Jesika Patel
Jolly Patel
Shevon Patel
Sonal Amit Patel
Arati Shah
Deepa Swamy-Kurian
Manisha Vakharia-Patel
Sarika Wadhawan
Delta Phi Omega was envisioned as an organization that would focus on the diverse Indian culture through participation in various community and service projects, promote the advancement of South Asian women, and unite women among the South Asian community. Its pillars are sisterhood, honesty, loyalty, respect, and friendship.

The sorority's annual national initiatives are "Be The Change" National Community Partner and Literacy Through Unity Week. The annual Literacy Through Unity Week raises awareness of children’s education and literacy, along with fundraising at the respective universities and cities to support related charities. Events associated with Literacy Through Unity Week include community service projects, movie nights, books and panel discussions, fundraising nights, and Informationals by nonprofit  organizations such as Asha for Education, Pratham, and CARE.

Organization 
In 2001, sisters foresaw a rapid expansion of Delta Phi Omega and recognized the need for a central governing body. Therefore they founded the first National Council of Delta Phi Omega on February 1, 2002, which became the administrative entity of the sorority. The National Council ensures the continuity of the original purpose, mission, and ideals of the National Founding Mothers. Its functions also include handling matters of controversy, coordinating national-level programs, and overseeing chapter compliance with the national policies. Each year at the national conference women are elected to the National Council, board, and regional director positions.

After National Council the next tier is National Board, which is made up of positions that are more geared towards expansion and maintaining the sorority on an organizational level, keeping records and ensuring everything continues to run smoothly and professionally.

Following National Board are Regional Directors. Delta Phi Omega is currently divided into nine regions, with each region consisting of about four to nine schools. The final tier is an Alumna Advisor, which each charter has.

Chapters 
These are the chapters and charters of Delta Phi Omega. Active chapters and charters listed in bold; inactive chapters and charters are in italics.

Notes

See also 
List of social fraternities and sororities

References 

Fraternities and sororities in the United States
Asian-American fraternities and sororities
Student organizations established in 1998
1998 establishments in Texas